Anything GOEs is a news website that covers figure skating. The name refers to Grade of execution (GOE), part of the scoring system used in the ISU Judging System.

Founded in 2019, the website posts up-to-date information about figure skating competitions globally and international skaters. They live tweet competitions with viewing links and results. They have also interviewed skaters including four-time Polish national champion Ekaterina Kurakova, five-time French national champion Kevin Aymoz and Canadian pairs team Evelyn Walsh and Trennt Michaud.

Anything GOEs also post highlights of skaters debuting or executing Ultra C elements with a positive GOE, and broke the news of Vanessa James release to compete for Canada.

References

External links
 Official website

Sports blogs
Figure skating websites